For the Network, see Hits Radio. For the National DAB station, see Hits Radio UK.

Hits Radio Manchester is an Independent local radio station owned and operated by Bauer as part of the Hits Radio network. It broadcasts to Greater Manchester.

As of December 2022, the station has a weekly audience of 261,000 listeners according to RAJAR.

History

Piccadilly Radio

Originally known as Piccadilly Radio, the station commenced broadcasting from studios at Piccadilly Plaza in Manchester city centre at 5am on Tuesday 2 April 1974 - the fifth Independent Local Radio station to launch and the first of its kind in northern England. The first presenter on air was Roger Day and the first song played on air was "Good Vibrations" by The Beach Boys.

In early 1987, due to a nationwide reorganisation of the FM band, Piccadilly moved its VHF (FM) frequency from 97 to 103 FM. A year later, the Government and the IBA began encouraging all ILR stations with multiple frequencies to provide split programming in order to increase listener choice and competition.

Key 103
Piccadilly split its services into two on Saturday 3 September 1988. Key 103 launched at midday on 103 FM while the original Piccadilly Radio service continued on 1152 AM.

The first presenters on air were Tim Grundy and Rebecca Want. Other presenters included Peter Baker, Adrian Bell, Tony Michealides, Stu Allan. The first jingle package was produced by Stowe Bowden Wilson and featuring voiceovers from Steve Coogan. The first song played upon launch was Alive and Kicking by Simple Minds.

Positioning itself as Music, not music, Key 103 aimed at an upmarket audience with a mix of AOR and chart music and high-end specialist output including arts and business programming, comedy and weekly jazz, folk and classical music shows.

The station later opted for a more mainstream format with presenters from Piccadilly 1152 (later Piccadilly Gold) switching to the FM station, and in 1990, the station was rebranded as Piccadilly Key 103. The Piccadilly branding was gradually dropped during the 1990s.

In 1994, the station's owners Transworld Radio Group were brought by EMAP. Two years later, both Key 103 and its AM sister station moved from the Piccadilly Plaza studios to new headquarters at Castle Quay in Castlefield.

Hits Radio Manchester
On 18 April 2018, station owners Bauer Media announced Key 103 would be rebranded and relaunched as Hits Radio Manchester, a CHR-led music station aimed at 25-44 year olds on Monday 4 June 2018.

The station was merged with The Hits Radio to provide a single national service across the UK on DAB, Freeview and online - as Hits Radio UK In Manchester, Hits Radio continues to provide local news & information, traffic bulletins and advertising on its local platforms - 103 FM, DAB and online.

The Key 103 branding was phased out from Friday 25 May 2018 as the station entered a transition period ahead of the launch of Hits Radio at 6am on Monday 4 June 2018. The first song played on air - decided by an online poll via the Manchester Evening News - was "Greatest Day" by Take That.

The former Key branding was retained by the sister AM station, which rebranded as Key Radio on the same day as the launch of Hits Radio Manchester. The following January, the Key branding was retired when the station rebranded as Greatest Hits Radio Manchester.

Technical
The station broadcasts on the analogue frequency 103 FM via a transmitter at Saddleworth, from where broadcasting commenced upon the launch of Piccadilly Radio on 2 April 1974.

The DAB signal is broadcast from transmitters located at Winter Hill and City Tower, Manchester on the CE Manchester multiplex. With the addition of Sutton Common, near Macclesfield, the DAB signal has a reliable coverage area that includes Greater Manchester, South Lancashire, most of Cheshire, parts of North East Wales and Merseyside, with much better reception than the FM frequency can provide as 103.0 suffers from co-channel interference from other stations on nearby frequencies.

In May 2016, two additional digital transmitters were launched at Littleborough and Saddleworth.

Programming
All programming is produced and broadcast from Bauer's Manchester studios.

Hits Radio UK opts out from Manchester's local service for national news bulletins, traffic updates, relevant information and advertising on its national DAB and TV platforms.

News
As of April 2019, Bauer's Manchester newsroom airs hourly local news bulletins on the hour from 6am-7pm on weekdays and 7am-1pm at weekends. Headlines air at 30 minutes past the hour during Hits Radio Breakfast on weekdays, alongside regular traffic bulletins at breakfast and drive.

Syndicated national bulletins from Sky News Radio in London are carried overnight. Bespoke networked bulletins also air on weekend afternoons, produced from Bauer's Leeds newsroom.

Presenters

Notable current presenters

 Fleur East (Hits Radio Breakfast: weekday mornings)
 Gemma Atkinson and Mike Toolan (weekday drivetime)
 Wes Butters (Sunday mornings)
 Sarah-Jane Crawford (The UK Chart Show, cover)
 Max George (Friday Night Hits)
 Sheree Murphy (Sunday mornings)

Notable past presenters

 Stu Allan
 Rich Clarke
 Robin Galloway
 Tim Grundy
 Lucy Horobin
 Gethin Jones
 Jason King
 Geoff Lloyd
 Scott Mills
 Pete Mitchell
 Justin Moorhouse
 Darryl Morris
 Steve Penk
 Karl Pilkington
 Joel Ross
 Graeme Smith
 James Stannage
 Mike Sweeney
 David Vitty
 Becky Want

References

External links
 Hits Radio

Bauer Radio
Hits Radio
Radio stations in Manchester
Radio stations established in 1988